Dmitri Suur (before marriage Dmitri Rodin, ; born February 25, 1975) is an Estonian professional ice hockey player. He currently plays for the Sheffield Steeldogs of the English Premier Ice Hockey League.

Best defenseman at 1995 World Junior Ice Hockey Championships Pool C2.

He was a former Russian citizen and got Estonian citizenship in 2005.

References

External links

1975 births
Estonian ice hockey defencemen
Estonian people of Russian descent
HC Slovan Bratislava players
KH Sanok players
Living people
Sacramento River Rats players
San Jose Rhinos players
Sportspeople from Tallinn
Estonian expatriate ice hockey people
Soviet ice hockey defencemen
Estonian expatriate sportspeople in the United States
Estonian expatriate sportspeople in Latvia
Estonian expatriate sportspeople in Canada
Estonian expatriate sportspeople in the Czech Republic
Estonian expatriate sportspeople in Denmark
Estonian expatriate sportspeople in Poland
Estonian expatriate sportspeople in England
Estonian expatriate sportspeople in Romania
Expatriate ice hockey players in Denmark
Expatriate ice hockey players in England
Expatriate ice hockey players in the United States
Expatriate ice hockey players in Poland
Expatriate ice hockey players in Latvia
Expatriate ice hockey players in the Czech Republic
Estonian expatriate sportspeople in Slovakia
Expatriate ice hockey players in Slovakia
Expatriate ice hockey players in Romania
Estonian expatriate sportspeople in Russia
Expatriate ice hockey players in Russia
Expatriate ice hockey players in Canada